Ilistanbetovo (İlestanbät) is a rural locality (a village) in Muzyakovsky Selsoviet, Krasnokamsky District, Bashkortostan, Russia. The population was 182 as of 2010. There are 4 streets.

Geography 
Ilistanbetovo is located 24 km northeast of Nikolo-Beryozovka (the district's administrative centre) by road. Ishmetovo is the nearest rural locality.

References 

Rural localities in Krasnokamsky District